Milton Township is one of the nineteen townships of Wood County, Ohio, United States.  The 2010 census found 979 people in the township.

Geography
Located in the western part of the county, it borders the following townships:
Weston Township - north
Plain Township - northeast corner
Liberty Township - east
Henry Township - southeast corner
Jackson Township - south
Bartlow Township, Henry County - southwest corner
Richfield Township, Henry County - west
Damascus Township, Henry County - northwest corner

Three villages are located in the township:
Custar, in the west center.
Milton Center, in the north center.
Part of Weston, in the north.

Name and history
Milton Township was established in 1835. It is one of five Milton Townships statewide.

Government
The township is governed by a three-member board of trustees, who are elected in November of odd-numbered years to a four-year term beginning on the following January 1. Two are elected in the year after the presidential election and one is elected in the year before it. There is also an elected township fiscal officer, who serves a four-year term beginning on April 1 of the year after the election, which is held in November of the year before the presidential election. Vacancies in the fiscal officership or on the board of trustees are filled by the remaining trustees.

References

External links
County website

Townships in Wood County, Ohio
Townships in Ohio